Joseph Roland Beltran Damiles (born May 10, 1996), better known as Anjo Damiles, is a Filipino actor and commercial model.

On 2015, he became one of the leading men of actress Julia Montes as Andrew "Andy" Delgado in the afternoon melodrama series Doble Kara and thought of it as his biggest break yet in showbiz. Damiles is also known for portraying the role of Jasper Agcaoili in First Yaya and First Lady.

Personal life 
He is a grandnephew of TV host/talent manager Boy Abunda and a nephew of former beauty queen Miss Universe 1996 candidate Aileen Damiles, his father's younger sister.

Career 
Damiles started to work in commercials and print ads at the age of eight. He first appeared in Candy Magazine (September 2011). 
He has been seen having guest roles in ABS CBN series Forevermore of 2014 as Jonathan Acosta with Enrique Gil and Liza Soberano, Ipaglaban mo, Maalaala mo kaya and Wansapanatym with James Reid and Nadine Lustre. He trended on Twitter when he had his first guesting on Gandang Gabi, Vice! with Albie Casiño and Edgar Allan Guzman.

He joined Star Magic on 2015 and at the 7th Annual Star Magic Games, Damiles bagged the adult division’s Rookie of the Year award. Later of 2015, he got the role of Andy Delgado as one Julia Montes leading men in Doble Kara.

In July 2019, he transferred to GMA Artist Center (later Sparkle) after five years with Star Magic.

Filmography

Television

Film

References

External links 
 
 https://www.gmanetwork.com/sparkle/artists/anjodamiles

1996 births
Living people
Filipino male television actors
Male actors from Metro Manila
People from Las Piñas
GMA Network personalities
ABS-CBN personalities
Star Magic
Tagalog people
Filipino male models